Rivière à la Loutre or Rivière de la Loutre may refer to:

Places

Canada and United States
 Otter River (Northwest Branch Saint John River tributary), in Montmagny Regional County Municipality, Quebec and Maine, United States

Canada 
 Rivière de la Grande Loutre, tributary of the Péribonka River in Passes-Dangereuses, Quebec
 Petite rivière de la Loutre, on Anticosti Island, Quebec
 Rivière à la Loutre (rivière du Sud tributary), in Sainte-Euphémie-sur-Rivière-du-Sud, Quebec
 Rivière à la Loutre (Témiscamingue), tributary of the Ottawa River in Témiscamingue Regional County Municipality, Quebec
 Rivière à la Loutre (La Malbaie), in La Malbaie, Quebec
 Rivière à la Loutre (Saguenay River tributary), in Saint-Fulgence, Quebec
 Rivière à la Loutre (Ashuapmushuan River tributary), in Saint-Thomas-Didyme, Quebec
 Rivière à la Loutre (Gouffre River tributary), in Capitale-Nationale, Quebec
 Rivière à la Loutre (L'Île-d'Anticosti), on Anticosti Island, Quebec

United States 
 Loutre River (Missouri River), a tributary of the Missouri River in Missouri

See also 
 Loutre (disambiguation)
 Otter (disambiguation)